This article displays the squads for the 1996 UEFA European Under-21 Championship. Only players born on or after 1 January 1973 were eligible to play. Players in bold have later been capped at full international level.

Czech Republic
Head coach: Ivan Kopecký

Source:

France

Head coach: Raymond Domenech

Germany

Head coach: Hannes Löhr

Source:

Hungary

Head coach: Antal Dunai

Source:

Italy

Head coach: Cesare Maldini

Portugal

Head coach: Nelo Vingada

Source:

Scotland

Head coach: Tommy Craig

Spain

Head coach: Javier Clemente

References

Squad
UEFA European Under-21 Championship squads